A padrão (standard;) is a stone pillar left by Portuguese maritime explorers in the 15th and 16th centuries to record significant landfalls and thereby establish primacy and possession. They were often placed on promontories and capes or at the mouths of major rivers. Early markers were simple wooden pillars or crosses but they deteriorated quickly in the tropical climate where they were often erected. Later, padrões were carved from stone in the form of a pillar surmounted by a cross and the royal coat of arms.

History
Diogo Cão was the first to place stone padrões on his voyage of discovery along the coast of Africa in 1482–1484. They had been carved ahead of time in Portugal and carried in his ship at the behest of King João II. Cão placed the pillars at points in what is now Gabon, Angola and Namibia. The first was installed at the mouth of the river Congo. In August 1483 he erected one on the headlands of Angola at Cabo Negro with the inscription:

In 1522 the Portuguese mariner Henrique Leme negotiated a treaty with the Sunda Kingdom and in commemoration he raised a padrão at the kingdom's main port, Sunda Kalapa, now part of Jakarta, Indonesia. The Luso Sundanese padrão was rediscovered in 1918 and is exhibited at the National Museum of Indonesia.

Other notable explorers known to have erected padrões include Pero da Covilhã, Bartolomeu Dias, Vasco da Gama, Goncalo Coelho and Jorge Álvares.

The Lisbon Geographic Society managed to restore in the 20th century three  erected by Diogo Cão and one by Bartolomeu Dias.

At the Dias Cross Memorial on the coast of South Africa's Eastern Cape province, there is a padrão replica on a promontory at what is now known as Kwaaihoek; it was placed by Bartolomeu Dias in 1488 to mark the site of his most easterly landfall after becoming the first European navigator to round the Cape of Good Hope. The original padrão was discovered by Eric Axelson in the 1930s – it had fallen, or was pushed, off the top of Kwaaihoek, and was in pieces in the gullies below. Axelson recovered these pieces and was able to reconstruct the stone monument; the reconstructed original now stands in the William Cullen Library of the University of the Witwatersrand in Johannesburg.

List of padrões

See also

Padrão dos Descobrimentos
Birthing Stone of Portugal

References
Notes

Citations

Sources

Types of monuments and memorials
Cross symbols
Maritime history of Portugal
Portuguese exploration in the Age of Discovery